Paschalis Voutsias (Greek: Πασχάλης Βουτσιάς, born 23 March 1990) is a football midfielder, who plays for Giannitsa.

Club career

Iraklis
Voutsias signed his first professional contract with Iraklis in the summer of 2009. He debuted for the club in a match against AEK on 13 September 2010, coming in as a substitute for Javier Martos in the 70th minute of the game. Iraklis eventually lost the match 1–0. Voutsias will be remembered for his first goal with Iraklis' shirt. It was a header, in an away match against Skoda Xanthi, in the 2nd minute of the game. That was the 2000th goal for Iraklis in the Greek Superleague. On 29 January 2014 Voutsias signed for Anagennisi Karditsa.

Aris
On 3 November Voutsias signed for Aris.

Career statistics

References

External links
 Paschalis Voutsias at Iraklis FC Official site.

Greek footballers
Greece youth international footballers
1990 births
Living people
Super League Greece players
Iraklis Thessaloniki F.C. players
Place of birth missing (living people)
Association football forwards
Footballers from Thessaloniki